Parkinson's Disease is an open access medical journal covering Parkinson's disease. It was established in 2009 and is published by Hindawi Publishing Corporation. According to the Journal Citation Reports, the journal has a 2016 impact factor of 1.702.

References

V==External links==

Hindawi Publishing Corporation academic journals
Parkinson's disease
Neurology journals
Publications established in 2009
English-language journals
Irregular journals